"Bob Dylan Blues" is a song written in 1965 by Syd Barrett, the founder of Pink Floyd. Recorded during sessions for Barrett, it was unreleased until it turned up in 2001. The song was included in The Best of Syd Barrett.

Writing and recording
The song was supposedly written by Barrett after attending a concert in 1964. It's one of Barrett's very earliest songs written before he even had a publishing deal. This song, along with "Terrapin" and "Maisie", reflected Barrett's early interest in the blues.

The song was recorded on February 26, 1970, and was since largely forgotten about until David Gilmour unearthed the tape in his personal collection. It was released in 2001 on the Barrett compilation The Best of Syd Barrett: Wouldn't You Miss Me?.

Personnel
 Syd Barrett – acoustic guitar, lead and harmony vocals

References

Syd Barrett songs
Songs written by Syd Barrett
1965 songs
Folk rock songs
Blues rock songs
Song recordings produced by David Gilmour